The Biberach Open was a tournament for professional female tennis players played on indoor hard courts. The event was classified as a $50,000+H ITF Women's Circuit tournament and was held in Biberach, Germany, from 2005 to 2010, with the exception of 2008.

Past finals

Singles

Doubles

External links 
 ITF search

ITF Women's World Tennis Tour
Hard court tennis tournaments
Tennis tournaments in Germany
Recurring sporting events established in 2005
Recurring sporting events disestablished in 2010
Defunct tennis tournaments in Germany